Algernon Henry Blackwood, CBE (14 March 1869 – 10 December 1951) was an English broadcasting narrator, journalist, novelist and short story writer, and among the most prolific ghost story writers in the history of the genre. The literary critic S. T. Joshi stated, "His work is more consistently meritorious than any weird writer's except Dunsany's" and that his short story collection Incredible Adventures (1914) "may be the premier weird collection of this or any other century".

Life and work
Blackwood was born in Shooter's Hill (now part of south-east London, then part of north-west Kent). Between 1871 and 1880, he lived at Crayford Manor House, Crayford and he was educated at Wellington College. His father, Sir Stevenson Arthur Blackwood, was a Post Office administrator; his mother, Harriet Dobbs, was the widow of the 6th Duke of Manchester. According to Peter Penzoldt, his father, "though not devoid of genuine good-heartedness, had appallingly narrow religious ideas." After he read the work of a Hindu sage left behind at his parents' house, he developed an interest in Buddhism and other eastern philosophies. Blackwood had a varied career, working as a dairy farmer in Canada, where he also operated a hotel for six months, as a newspaper reporter in New York City, bartender, model, journalist for The New York Times, private secretary, businessman, and violin teacher. During his time in Canada, he also became one of the founding members of Toronto Theosophical Society in February of 1891.

Throughout his adult life, he was an occasional essayist for periodicals. In his late thirties, he moved back to England and started to write stories of the supernatural. He was successful, writing at least ten original collections of short stories and later telling them on radio and television. He also wrote 14 novels, several children's books and a number of plays, most of which were produced, but not published. He was an avid lover of nature and the outdoors, as many of his stories reflect. To satisfy his interest in the supernatural, he joined The Ghost Club. He never married; according to his friends he was a loner, but also cheerful company.

Jack Sullivan stated that "Blackwood's life parallels his work more neatly than perhaps that of any other ghost story writer. Like his lonely but fundamentally optimistic protagonists, he was a combination of mystic and outdoorsman; when he wasn't steeping himself in occultism, including Rosicrucianism, or Buddhism he was likely to be skiing or mountain climbing." Blackwood was a member of one of the factions of the Hermetic Order of the Golden Dawn, as was his contemporary Arthur Machen. Cabalistic themes influence his novel The Human Chord.

His two best-known stories are probably "The Willows" and "The Wendigo". He would also often write stories for newspapers at short notice, with the result that he was unsure exactly how many short stories he had written and there is no sure total. Though Blackwood wrote a number of horror stories, his most typical work seeks less to frighten than to induce a sense of awe. Good examples are the novels The Centaur, which reaches a climax with a traveller's sight of a herd of the mythical creatures; and Julius LeVallon and its sequel The Bright Messenger, which deal with reincarnation and the possibility of a new, mystical evolution of human consciousness. In correspondence with Peter Penzoldt, Blackwood wrote,

My fundamental interest, I suppose, is signs and proofs of other powers that lie hidden in us all; the extension, in other words, of human faculty. So many of my stories, therefore, deal with extension of consciousness; speculative and imaginative treatment of possibilities outside our normal range of consciousness.... Also, all that happens in our universe is natural; under Law; but an extension of our so limited normal consciousness can reveal new, extra-ordinary powers etc., and the word "supernatural" seems the best word for treating these in fiction. I believe it possible for our consciousness to change and grow, and that with this change we may become aware of a new universe. A "change" in consciousness, in its type, I mean, is something more than a mere extension of what we already possess and know.

Autobiography

Blackwood wrote an autobiography of his early years, Episodes Before Thirty (1923), and there is a biography, Starlight Man, by Mike Ashley.

Death
Blackwood died after several strokes. Officially his death on 10 December 1951 was from cerebral thrombosis, with arteriosclerosis as a contributing factor. He was cremated at Golders Green crematorium. A few weeks later his nephew took his ashes to Saanenmöser Pass in the Swiss Alps, and scattered them in the mountains that he had loved for more than forty years.

Bibliography

Novels
By date of first publication:
Jimbo: A Fantasy (1909)
The Education of Uncle Paul (1909)
The Human Chord (1910)
The Centaur (1911)
A Prisoner in Fairyland (1913); sequel to The Education of Uncle Paul
The Extra Day (1915)
Julius LeVallon (1916)
The Wave (1916)
The Promise of Air (1918)
The Garden of Survival (1918)
The Bright Messenger (1921); sequel to Julius LeVallon
Episodes Before Thirty (1923)
Dudley & Gilderoy: A Nonsense (1929)
Children's novels:
Sambo and Snitch (1927)
The Fruit Stoners: Being the Adventures of Maria Among the Fruit Stoners (1934)

Plays
By date of first performance:
The Starlight Express (1915), coauthored with Violet Pearn; incidental music by Edward Elgar; based on Blackwood's 1913 novel A Prisoner in Fairyland
Karma a reincarnation play in prologue epilogue and three acts (1918), coauthored with Violet Pearn;
The Crossing (1920a), coauthored with Bertram Forsyth; based on Blackwood's 1913 short story "Transition"
Through the Crack (1920), coauthored with Violet Pearn; based on Blackwood's 1909 novel The Education of Uncle Paul and 1915 novel The Extra Day
White Magic (1921), coauthored with Bertram Forsyth
The Halfway House (1921), coauthored with Elaine Ainley
Max Hensig (1929), coauthored with Frederick Kinsey Peile; based on Blackwood's 1907 short story "Max Hensig – Bacteriologist and Murderer"

Short fiction collections
By date of first publication:
The Empty House and Other Ghost Stories (1906); original collection
The Listener and Other Stories (1907); original collection
John Silence (1908); original collection; reprinted with added preface, 1942
The Lost Valley and Other Stories (1910); original collection
Pan's Garden: a Volume of Nature Stories (1912); original collection
Ten Minute Stories (1914a); original collection
Incredible Adventures (1914b); original collection
Day and Night Stories (1917); original collection
Wolves of God, and Other Fey Stories (1921), ; original collection
Tongues of Fire and Other Sketches (1924); original collection
Ancient Sorceries and Other Tales (1927a); selections from previous Blackwood collections
The Dance of Death and Other Tales (1927b); selections from previous Blackwood collections; reprinted as 1963's The Dance of Death and Other Stories
Strange Stories (1929); selections from previous Blackwood collections
Short Stories of To-Day & Yesterday (1930); selections from previous Blackwood collections
The Willows and Other Queer Tales (1932); selected by G. F. Maine from previous Blackwood collections
Shocks (1935); original collection
The Tales of Algernon Blackwood (1938); selections from previous Blackwood collections, with a new preface by Blackwood
Selected Tales of Algernon Blackwood (1942); selections from previous Blackwood collections (not to be confused with the 1964 Blackwood collection of the same title)
Selected Short Stories of Algernon Blackwood (1945); selections from previous Blackwood collections
The Doll and One Other (1946); original collection
Tales of the Uncanny and Supernatural (1949); selections from previous Blackwood collections
In the Realm of Terror (1957); selections from previous Blackwood collections
The Dance of Death and Other Stories (1963); reprint of 1927's The Dance of Death and Other Tales
Selected Tales of Algernon Blackwood (1964); selections from previous Blackwood collections (not to be confused with the 1942 Blackwood collection of the same title)
Tales of the Mysterious and Macabre (1967); selections from previous Blackwood collections
Ancient Sorceries and Other Stories (1968); selections from previous Blackwood collections
Best Ghost Stories of Algernon Blackwood (1973), selected and introduced by Everett F. Bleiler; selections from previous Blackwood collections; includes Blackwood's own preface to 1938's The Tales of Algernon Blackwood
The Best Supernatural Tales of Algernon Blackwood (1973); selected and introduced by Felix Morrow; selections from 1929's Strange Stories
Tales of Terror and Darkness (1977); omnibus edition of Tales of the Mysterious and Macabre (1967) and Tales of the Uncanny and Supernatural (1949).
Tales of the Supernatural (1983); selected and introduced by Mike Ashley; selections from previous Blackwood collections
The Magic Mirror (1989); Original collection selected, introduced, and with notes by Mike Ashley; 
The Complete John Silence Stories (1997); selected and introduced by S. T. Joshi; reprint of 1908's John Silence (without the preface to the 1942 reprint) and the one remaining John Silence story, "A Victim of Higher Space"
Ancient Sorceries and Other Weird Stories (2002); selected, introduced, and notes by S. T. Joshi; selections from previous Blackwood collections
Algernon Blackwood's Canadian Tales of Terror (2004); selected, introduced, with notes by John Robert Colombo; eight stories of special Canadian interest plus information on the author's years in Canada

Essays
The Lure of the Unknown: Essays on the Strange (2022); edited and introduced by Mike Ashley. Dublin: Swan River Press. Limited to 400 unnumbered copies. (Two photographic postcards and a facsimile signature of Blackwood laid in).

Legacy
H. P. Lovecraft included Blackwood as one of the "Modern Masters" in the section of that name in "Supernatural Horror in Literature".
Authors who have been influenced by Blackwood's work include William Hope Hodgson, George Allan England, H. P. Lovecraft, H. Russell Wakefield, "L. Adams Beck" (Elizabeth Louisa Moresby), Margery Lawrence, Evangeline Walton, Ramsey Campbell and Graham Joyce.
In the first draft of his essay "Notes on the Nomenclature of The Lord of the Rings", J. R. R. Tolkien stated that he derived the phrase "crack of doom" from an unnamed story by Algernon Blackwood. In her book, Tolkien's Modern Reading: Middle Earth Beyond the Middle Ages, Dr. Holly Ordway states that this unnamed Blackwood work is a novel titled "The Education of Uncle Paul".
Frank Belknap Long's 1928 story "The Space-Eaters" alludes to Blackwood's fiction.
Clark Ashton Smith's story "Genius Loci" (1933) was inspired by Blackwood's story "The Transfer".
The plot of Caitlin R. Kiernan's novel Threshold (2001) is influenced by Blackwood's work. Kiernan has cited Blackwood as an important influence on her writing.
In The Books in My Life, Henry Miller chose Blackwood's The Bright Messenger as "the most extraordinary novel on psychoanalysis, one that dwarfs the subject."
Algernon Blackwood appears as a character in the novel The Curse of the Wendigo by Rick Yancey.
In the PS4 game Until Dawn, the main setting is named Blackwood Pines, as the main antagonist is a Wendigo.

Critical studies
An early essay on Blackwood's work was "Algernon Blackwood: An Appreciation," by Grace Isabel Colbron (1869–1943), which appeared in The Bookman in February 1915.
Peter Penzoldt devotes the final chapter of The Supernatural in Fiction (1952) to an analysis of Blackwood's work and dedicates the book "with deep admiration and gratitude, to Algernon Blackwood, the greatest of them all".
A critical analysis of Blackwood's work appears in Jack Sullivan, Elegant Nightmares: The English Ghost Story From Le Fanu to Blackwood, 1978.
David Punter has an essay on Blackwood.
There is a critical essay on Blackwood's work in S. T. Joshi's The Weird Tale (1990).
Edward Wagenknecht analyses Blackwood's work in his book Seven Masters of Supernatural Fiction.
 David Grimbleby, "Algernon Blackwood: A Personal Appreciation". Occulture 1, No 2 [1994]
 Eugene Thacker, in his "Horror of Philosophy" series of books, discusses Blackwood's stories "The Willows" and "The Man Whom The Trees Loved" as examples of how supernatural horror poses philosophical questions regarding the relation between human beings and the "cosmic indifference" of the world.

See also

List of horror fiction authors
Religion and mythology
Tales of Mystery, a 1960s British supernatural television drama series
Weird Fiction

References

General sources

 US edition of Starlight Man: The Extraordinary Life of Algernon Blackwood.
 UK edition of Algernon Blackwood: An Extraordinary Life.
 Modern reissue of subject's memoir; originally published in 1923 (London: Cassell & Co.).
Burleson, Donald. "Algernon Blackwood's 'The Listener: A Hearing'". Studies in Weird Fiction 5 (Spring 1989), pp. 15–19.
Colombo, John Robert. "Blackwood's Books: A Bibliography Devoted to Algernon Blackwood" Toronto  Hounslow Press 1981 
Colombo, John Robert. (ed) Algernon Blackwood's Canadian Tales of Terror Lake Eugenia, Ontario Battered Silicon Dispatch Box 2004 
Goddin, Jeffrey. "Subtle Perceptions: The Fantasy Novels of Algernon Blackwood" in Darrell Schweitzer (ed) Discovering Classic Fantasy Fiction, Gillette NJ: Wildside Press, 1986, pp. 94–103.
Johnson, George M. "Algernon Blackwood". Dictionary of Literary Biography.  Late-Victorian and Edwardian British Novelists, First Series. Ed. George M. Johnson. Detroit: Gale, 1995.
Johnson, George M. "Algernon Blackwood". Dictionary of Literary Biography. British Short-Fiction Writers, 1880–1914. Ed. William F. Naufftus. Detroit: Gale, 1995.
Johnson, George M. "Algernon Blackwood". New Dictionary of National Biography. Ed. Brian Harrison. Oxford: Oxford University Press, 2004.
Johnson, George M. "Algernon Blackwood’s Modernist Experiments in Psychical Detection". Formal Investigations: Aesthetic Style in Late-Victorian and Edwardian Detective Fiction.  Stuttgart: Ibidem Press, 2007. pp. 29–51.
Johnson, George M. "The Other Side of Edwardian Fiction: Two Forgotten Fantasy Novels of 1911". Wormwood: Literature of the fantastic, supernatural and decadent. UK, No. 16 (Spring 2011) 3–15.

Thacker, Eugene. "How Algernon Blackwood Turned Nature Into Sublime Horror". LitHub. (March 8, 2021).

Further reading
Goddin, Jeffrey. "Subtle Perceptions: The Fantasy Novels of Algernon Blackwood" in Darrell Schweitzer, ed. Discovering Classic Fantasy Fiction.  Gillette, NJ: Wildside Press, 1996, 94-103.
Gilbert, Stuart. "Algernon Blackwood, Novelist and Mystic". Transition No 35 (July 1935).
Letson, Russell Francis J. "The Approaches to Mystery: The Fantasies of Arthur Machen and Algernon Blackwood." Dissertation Abstracts International, 36 (1976): 8047A (Southern Illinois University).
Sullivan, Jack. Elegant Nightmares: The English Ghost Story from Le Fanu to Blackwood. Athens, OH: Ohio University Press, 1978.
Wagenknecht, Edward. Seven Masters of Supernatural Fiction. Westport, CT: Greenwood Press, 1991, Chapter Four.

External links

Fantastic Fiction Algernon Blackwood page
Spitzer Interview: Adapting The Willows
Collection of Blackwood Stories
Algernon Blackwood Quotes

Play Starlight Express at Great War Theatre

1869 births
1951 deaths
20th-century British short story writers
20th-century English dramatists and playwrights
20th-century English memoirists
20th-century English novelists
Hermetic Order of the Golden Dawn
English horror writers
Ghost story writers
English short story writers
People from Shooter's Hill
People from Crayford
People educated at Wellington College, Berkshire
Commanders of the Order of the British Empire
Deaths from cerebral thrombosis
Weird fiction writers
The New York Times people